Iodes is a genus of flowering plants belonging to the family Icacinaceae.

Its native range is Tropical Africa, Madagascar, Tropical and Subtropical Asia.

Species:

Iodes africana 
Iodes cirrhosa 
Iodes globulifera 
Iodes kamerunensis 
Iodes klaineana 
Iodes liberica 
Iodes madagascariensis 
Iodes nectarifera 
Iodes ovalis 
Iodes perrieri 
Iodes philippinensis 
Iodes pierlotii 
Iodes reticulata 
Iodes scandens 
Iodes seguinii 
Iodes seretii 
Iodes usambarensis 
Iodes velutina 
Iodes vitiginea 
Iodes yangambiensis 
Iodes yatesii

References

Icacinaceae
Asterid genera